Essex Fells is a borough in Essex County, in the U.S. state of New Jersey. As of the 2020 United States census, the borough's population was 2,244, an increase of 131 (+6.2%) from the 2010 census count of 2,113, which in turn reflected a decline of 49 (−2.3%) from the 2,162 counted in the 2000 census.

Essex Fells was incorporated as a borough by an act of the New Jersey Legislature on March 31, 1902, from portions of Caldwell Township (now Fairfield Township). The community's name was derived by taking "Essex" from the name of the county and adding "Fells" from the name of John F. Fell which also means hill or down.

New Jersey Family magazine ranked Essex Fells as the best town for families in its 2016 rankings of "New Jersey's Best Towns for Families". New Jersey Monthly magazine ranked Essex Fells as its 10th best place to live in its 2008 rankings of the "Best Places To Live" in New Jersey. Niche.com ranked Essex Fells as the seventh best place to live in its 2019 rankings of the "Best Places to Live" in New Jersey.

In 2010, Forbes.com listed Essex Fells as 182nd in its listing of "America's Most Expensive ZIP Codes", with a median home price of $1,140,885.

History
Essex Fells was part of the Horseneck Tract, which was an area that consisted of what are now the municipalities of Caldwell, West Caldwell, North Caldwell, Fairfield, Verona, Cedar Grove, Essex Fells, Roseland, and portions of Livingston and West Orange.

In 1702, settlers purchased the  Horseneck Tract—so-called because of its irregular shape that suggested a horse's neck and head—from the Lenni Lenape Native Americans for goods equal to $325. This purchase encompassed much of western Essex County, from the Orange, or First Mountain in the Watchung Mountain range to the Passaic River.

In the late 1800s, Philadelphia developer Anthony S. Drexel realized the impact of train travel on residential development and sent Charles W. Leavitt to the northern New Jersey area near the end of the Caldwell line. Leavitt, Drexel and Drexel's son-in-law John F. Fell formed the Suburban Land Company and purchased 1,000 acres of land from the estate of Revolutionary War General William J. Gould. In order to create their residential development the group commissioned noted architect Ernest W. Bowditch. The community's name was derived by taking "Essex" from the name of the county and adding "Fells" from the name of John F. Fell which also means hill or down.

Based on an ordinance passed in 1928, commercial activity in the borough is limited to a single three-story building constructed to look like a house and two small workshops on a dead end. , Essex Fells had 750 houses, most of which were custom built, with many occupying lots several acres in size. The borough has no apartment buildings, office buildings or traffic lights, and until recently, no condominiums. The only units available for rental are in carriage houses and other ancillary structures.

In 1981, the borough was one of seven Essex County municipalities to pass a referendum to become a township, joining four municipalities that had already made the change, of what would ultimately be more than a dozen Essex County municipalities to reclassify themselves as townships in order take advantage of federal revenue sharing policies that allocated townships a greater share of government aid to municipalities on a per capita basis. Effective January 1, 1992, it again became a borough.

Geography
According to the United States Census Bureau, the borough had a total area of 1.41 square miles (3.66 km2), including 1.41 square miles (3.65 km2) of land and 0.01 square miles (0.02 km2) of water (0.43%).

The borough borders the Essex County municipalities of Caldwell, North Caldwell, Roseland, Verona, West Caldwell and West Orange.

Climate

Demographics

2010 census

The Census Bureau's 2006–2010 American Community Survey showed that (in 2010 inflation-adjusted dollars) median household income was $182,031 (with a margin of error of +/− $16,894) and the median family income was $202,917 (+/− $46,038). Males had a median income of $120,417 (+/− $32,492) versus $72,500 (+/− $12,065) for females. The per capita income for the borough was $94,423 (+/− $11,353). About 0.9% of families and 0.9% of the population were below the poverty line, including 0.9% of those under age 18 and none of those age 65 or over.

2000 census
As of the 2000 United States census there were 2,162 people, 737 households, and 605 families residing in the borough. The population density was 1,534.0 people per square mile (592.0/km2). There were 761 housing units at an average density of 540.0 per square mile (208.4/km2). The racial makeup of the borough was 96.95% White, 0.46% African American, 0.19% Native American, 1.02% Asian, 0.14% from other races, and 1.25% from two or more races. Hispanic or Latino of any race were 1.20% of the population.

There were 737 households, out of which 40.0% had children under the age of 18 living with them, 75.3% were married couples living together, 5.3% had a female householder with no husband present, and 17.9% were non-families. 15.1% of all households were made up of individuals, and 8.4% had someone living alone who was 65 years of age or older. The average household size was 2.93 and the average family size was 3.28.

In the borough the population was spread out, with 29.7% under the age of 18, 3.6% from 18 to 24, 24.5% from 25 to 44, 27.5% from 45 to 64, and 14.7% who were 65 years of age or older. The median age was 40 years. For every 100 females, there were 96.9 males. For every 100 females age 18 and over, there were 94.6 males.

The median income for a household in the borough was $148,173, and the median income for a family was $175,000. Males had a median income of $100,000 versus $52,266 for females. The per capita income for the borough was $77,434. About 0.3% of families and 1.1% of the population were below the poverty line, including 0.9% of those under age 18 and 0.6% of those age 65 or over.

Parks and recreation
Grover Cleveland Park, the seventh-largest park in the Essex County park system, is a heavily wooded park covering  in the western section of the county along the Caldwell-Essex Fells border.

Essex Fells Pond, or also known as "The Pond" by Essex Fells residents, is a popular destination in the winter. Located on Fells Road, "The Pond" attracts people of all ages, typically during the months of December through March. Popular activities include ice skating, pond hockey, and figure skating.

Government

Local government
Essex Fells is governed under the Borough form of New Jersey municipal government, which is used in 218 municipalities (of the 564) statewide, making it the most common form of government in New Jersey. The governing body is comprised of the Mayor and the Borough Council, with all positions elected at-large on a partisan basis as part of the November general election. The Mayor is elected directly by the voters to a four-year term of office. The Borough Council is comprised of six members elected to serve three-year terms on a staggered basis, with two seats coming up for election each year in a three-year cycle. The Borough form of government used by Essex Fells is a "weak mayor / strong council" government in which council members act as the legislative body with the mayor presiding at meetings and voting only in the event of a tie. The mayor can veto ordinances subject to an override by a two-thirds majority vote of the council. The mayor makes committee and liaison assignments for council members, and most appointments are made by the mayor with the advice and consent of the council.

, the Mayor of Essex Fells is Republican Edward A. Davis, whose term of office ends December 31, 2025. Members of the Essex Fells Borough Council are Michael Cecere (R, 2024), Bernard J. D'Avella (R, 2023), Gregory J. Hindy (R, 2022), John A. King (R, 2023), Margaret D. O'Connor (R, 2022) and William B. Sullivan (R, 2024).

In November 2014, the Borough Council appointed Greg Hindy to fill the vacant seat expiring in December 2016 that had been held by Jane McWilliams, until she resigned from office. In the November 2015 general election, Hindy was elected to serve the balance of the term of office.

Federal, state, and county representation
Essex Fells is located in the 10th Congressional District and is part of New Jersey's 27th state legislative district.

Politics
As of March 2011, there were a total of 1,696 registered voters in Essex Fells, of which 347 (20.5%) were registered as Democrats, 847 (49.9%) were registered as Republicans and 499 (29.4%) were registered as Unaffiliated. There were 3 voters registered as Libertarians or Greens.

Essex Fells has supported Republican presidential candidates in each of the last five presidential elections, though the margins of victory have decreased.

In the 2013 gubernatorial election, Republican Chris Christie received 81.3% of the vote (590 cast), ahead of Democrat Barbara Buono with 18.6% (135 votes), and other candidates with 0.1% (1 vote), among the 736 ballots cast by the borough's 1,789 registered voters (10 ballots were spoiled), for a turnout of 41.1%. In the 2009 gubernatorial election, Republican Chris Christie received 68.5% of the vote (688 ballots cast), ahead of  Democrat Jon Corzine with 22.3% (224 votes), Independent Chris Daggett with 7.9% (79 votes) and other candidates with 0.5% (5 votes), among the 1,005 ballots cast by the borough's 1,682 registered voters, yielding a 59.8% turnout.

On a local level, Essex Fells has elected a Republican mayor in every vote held since becoming a borough in 1902.

Education
The Essex Fells School District serves public school students in pre-kindergarten through sixth grade at Essex Fells School. As of the 2018–19 school year, the district, comprised of one school, had an enrollment of 252 students and 32.4 classroom teachers (on an FTE basis), for a student–teacher ratio of 7.8:1. In 2016, the school was one of ten schools in New Jersey recognized as a National Blue Ribbon School by the United States Department of Education, a recognition celebrating excellence in academics.

Students in public school for seventh through twelfth grades attend the West Essex Regional School District, a regional school district serving students from Essex Fells, Fairfield, North Caldwell and Roseland. Schools in the district (with 2018–19 enrollment data from the National Center for Education Statistics) are 
West Essex Middle School with 564 students in grades 7–8 and 
West Essex High School with 1,123 students in grades 9–12. Seats on the nine-member board of education of the high school district are allocated based on population, with one seat assigned to Essex Fells.

Transportation

Roads and highways

County Route 527 and County Route 506 are the main roads serving Essex Fells.

Public transportation
NJ Transit provides service in the borough to and from Newark on the 29 and 71 routes.

Notable people

People who were born in, residents of, or otherwise closely associated with Essex Fells include:
 Bob Bradley (born 1958), former coach of the United States men's national soccer team
 Jeremy Brodeur (born 1996), professional ice hockey goalie
 Willis Carrier (1876–1950), known as the "father of the modern day air conditioner"
 Don Criqui (born 1940), sportscaster for CBS Sports
 Ian Eagle (born 1969), sports announcer
 Noah Eagle (born 1997), sporscaster for Fox Sports and the Tennis Channel.
 Connie Francis (born 1937), singer
 Justin Gimelstob (born 1977), retired professional tennis player
 Anne Steele Marsh (1901–1995), painter and printmaker whose watercolors, oil paintings and wood engravings were widely exhibited
 James Randall Marsh (1896–1965), artist
 Henry G. Morse (1884–1934), architect
 Elizabeth Parr-Johnston (born 1939), Canadian business woman
 Brian Rafalski (born 1973), former NHL defenseman who played for the New Jersey Devils
 Scott Stevens (born 1964), former NHL defenseman who played for the New Jersey Devils during his career
 Bo Sullivan (1937–2000), chairman of the New Jersey Turnpike Authority and a Republican Party politician who sought the nomination for Governor of New Jersey in the 1981 primary
 Johnny Sylvester (1915–1990), lived here when he was visited on October 11, 1926, by Babe Ruth, who promised that he would hit a home run on his behalf during the 1926 World Series
 John C. Whitehead (born 1922), former Chairman of Goldman Sachs who also served as the 9th United States Deputy Secretary of State

References

External links

 Essex Fells Borough website
 Essex Fells School
 
 School Data for the Essex Fells School, National Center for Education Statistics
 West Essex Regional School District

 
1902 establishments in New Jersey
Borough form of New Jersey government
Boroughs in Essex County, New Jersey
Populated places established in 1902